The Northwest Territorial Imperative (often shortened to the Northwest Imperative or simply known as the Northwest Front) is a white separatist idea that has been popularized since the 1970s–80s by white nationalist, white supremacist, white separatist and neo-Nazi groups within the United States. According to it, members of these groups are encouraged to relocate to a region of the Northwestern United States—Washington, Oregon, Idaho, and Western Montana—with the intention to eventually turn the region into an Aryan ethnostate. Depending on who defines the project, it can also include the entire states of Montana and Wyoming, plus Northern California.

Several reasons have been given as to why activists have chosen to turn this area into a future white homeland: it is farther removed from Black, Jewish and other minority locations than other areas of the United States are; it is geographically remote, making it harder for the federal government to uproot activists; its "wide open spaces" appeal to those who believe in the right to hunt and fish without any government regulations; and it would also give them access to seaports and Canada.

The formation of such a "White homeland" also involves the expulsion, euphemized as the "repatriation", of all non-Whites from the territory. The project is variously called "Northwest Imperative", "White American Bastion", "White Aryan Republic", "White Aryan Bastion", "White Christian Republic", or the "10% solution" by its promoters. White supremacist leaders Robert E. Miles, Robert Jay Mathews and Richard Butler were originally the main promoters of the idea.

The territory which is proposed by the Northwest Territorial Imperative overlaps with the territory of the Cascadia independence movement, and the two movements share similar flags, but they have no ties to each other. Cascadian independence activists overwhelmingly reject the White supremacist ideology of the NTI movement.

History 

The Oregon black exclusion laws of 1844, an attempt to expel all African Americans from the state, are cited as an early example of such a racist project in the region. White supremacist journalist Derek Stenzel, the Portland-based editor of Northwestern Initiative, emphasized that the 1859 constitution of Oregon explicitly stated that "no free negro, mulatto or Chinaman" could reside, vote, hold contract, or make business in the state. In his view, the Northwest Imperative project would be in line with the "high racist ideals" of the original settlers.

The primary proponents of a separatist white homeland in America were Richard Butler (1918–2004), the leader of the Idaho-based Aryan Nations, and Robert E. Miles (1925–1992), a white supremacist theologian from Michigan. In the early 1980s, the latter introduced the idea of a territorial separation in the Northwest in his seminar Birth of a Nation, where he urged whites to leave the American multicultural areas and "go in peace" to this region where they would remain a majority. In July 1986, the Aryan Nations Congress was organized around the theme of the "Northwest Territorial Imperative", and was attended by over 200 Klan and Neo-Nazi leaders, as well as 4,000–5,000 racist activists. During the Congress, Miles declared that the project could be achieved "by White nationalists moving to the area, buying land together or adjacent to each other and having families consisting of five or ten children [...] We will win the Northwest by out-breeding our opponents and keeping our children away from the insane and destructive values of the Establishment." His solution of setting aside the northwestern states (10% of the contiguous US territory) for a white nation was endorsed by the Knights of the KKK from Tuscumbia and key activists moved to the area. Different from fighting within a homeland like in the Deep South though, the imperative required a large migration of white supremacists from throughout the country, and it was generally rejected by Southern extremists. The project was also advertised by the Aryan Nations Church under the name "White Aryan Bastion".

A secondary supporter was Robert Jay Mathews (1953–1984), who lived in Metaline Falls, Washington, and advocated further colonization of the area. Fearing the "extinction of the white race", he endorsed the creation of a "White American Bastion" in the Pacific Northwest. In 1983, he delivered a speech before the National Alliance, a white supremacist organization which was led by William Luther Pierce, calling the "yeoman farmers and independent truckers" to rally behind his project. Mathews received the only standing ovation at the conference.

Support 
The idea has been endorsed by various organizations including White Aryan Resistance, Wotansvolk, the White Order of Thule, Aryan Nations and Northwestern Imperative.

The defunct Oregon-based white power skinhead organization Volksfront advocated for the Imperative, and Harold Covington founded the Northwest Front to promote white migration to the region.

The Northwest Territorial Imperative was the motivation for Randy Weaver and his family to move to Idaho in the early 1980s; they were later involved in the Ruby Ridge incident.

David Lane, proponent of the Fourteen Words, endorsed a form of the Northwest Territorial  Imperative advocating domestic terrorism to carve out "white living space" in the Mountain States.

See also
 American Redoubt – a political migration movement that covers a similar geographic area
 Die Trying, a Jack Reacher novel featuring a militia trying to implement the Northwest Territorial Imperative
 The Base – a paramilitary group that wants to among other goals establish a white ethnostate in the Pacific Northwest
 The Order – a paramilitary group that engaged in domestic terrorism to establish a white territorial imperative in the Pacific Northwest
 Volkstaat – proposal for self-determination for Afrikaner/Boer minority in South Africa

References

Bibliography

 
 
 
 
 
 
 
 
 

Neo-Nazi concepts
Northwestern United States
Politically motivated migrations
Politics and race in the United States
Separatism in the United States
White nationalism in Oregon
White supremacy in the United States
Proposed countries
Neo-Nazism in the United States
Alt-right
White separatism